The South African Railways Class GD 2-6-2+2-6-2 of 1925 was an articulated steam locomotive.

In 1925, the South African Railways placed four Class GD Garratt articulated locomotives with a 2-6-2+2-6-2 Double Prairie type wheel arrangement in branchline service. Another ten of these locomotives were delivered in 1926.

Manufacturer
The Class GD 2-6-2+2-6-2 Double Prairie type Garratt locomotive was marginally larger and more powerful than its predecessor Class GC, with a heavier axle loading, but also intended for branchline work. Four locomotives were delivered by Beyer, Peacock and Company in December 1925, numbered in the range from 2220 to 2223. These were followed in January 1926 by ten more from the same manufacturer, seven of them built in 1925 and numbered in the range from 2228 to 2234, and the last three built in 1926 and numbered in the range from 2235 to 2237.

Characteristics
They locomotives were superheated and had plate frames, Belpaire fireboxes, piston valves and Walschaerts valve gear.

As built, their coal bunkers had a  capacity. At some stage, the coal bunker of no. 2220 was enlarged to a  capacity.

Service
The locomotives were placed in service on the North Coast and the Pietermaritzburg to Franklin lines in Natal. From 1926, some were allocated to Paardeneiland to work on the line from Cape Town across Sir Lowry's Pass to Caledon in the Overberg. They were the first Garratts to work the Caledon line and were later joined by the two Class GK Garratts after the New Cape Central Railway was absorbed by the SAR in 1925.

The Class GD proved themselves as handy and trouble-free locomotives and gave good service for more than forty years. They were later allocated to the Cape Midland system to work across the Montagu Pass between George and Oudtshoorn for many years until they were finally all allocated to the Port Alfred branch. They remained there until they were withdrawn from service in 1967.

Illustration

References

2390
Beyer, Peacock locomotives
2-6-2+2-6-2 locomotives
Garratt locomotives
Cape gauge railway locomotives
Railway locomotives introduced in 1925
1925 in South Africa
Scrapped locomotives